Chengbei Road Subdistrict is a subdistrict of Zhoucun District, Zibo, Shandong, People's Republic of China, located in the northern part of the district and in the western suburbs of Zibo. , it has 16 residential communities under its administration.

See also 
 List of township-level divisions of Shandong

References 

Township-level divisions of Shandong